José Gabriel Díaz Cueva (13 June 1925 – 26 January 2018) was a Catholic bishop.

Diaz Cueva was ordained to the priesthood in 1950. He served as auxiliary bishop of the Archdiocese of Guayaquil, Ecuador from 1964 to 1967 and from 1975 to 1999. He also served as auxiliary of the Roman Catholic Diocese of Cuenca from 1976 to 1968 and was bishop of the Roman Catholic Diocese of Azogues, Ecuador from 1968 to 1975.

References

1925 births
2018 deaths
20th-century Roman Catholic bishops in Ecuador
Ecuadorian Roman Catholic archbishops
Roman Catholic bishops of Cuenca
Roman Catholic bishops of Azogues
Roman Catholic bishops of Guayaquil